The Breton Wikipedia is the Breton language version of Wikipedia, run by the Wikimedia Foundation.

History
The Breton Wikipedia  was established in June 2004. As of August 2008 it had over 20,000 articles, making it the 56th largest Wikipedia by article count. It reached 30,000 articles on 25 October 2009, ranking 51st out of the 250 Wikipedia editions. As of February 2010, it had over 31,000 articles, making it the 52nd largest Wikipedia by article count, and as of April 2011, it had over 37,000 articles, making it the 52nd largest Wikipedia by article count. In July 2014, the encyclopedia reached 50,000 articles, becoming the 71st largest Wikipedia by article count.

On 1 January 2017 it had just over 60,000 articles, making it the 73rd largest Wikipedia by article count. It is also the second largest Wikipedia edition in a Celtic language, after the Welsh Wikipedia but ahead of the Irish Wikipedia (even though that language has far more speakers).

The articles are written in the Peurunvan orthography. Some Diwan students contributed founding Wikipedian clubs.

See also
 Welsh Wikipedia
 Irish Wikipedia
 Scottish Gaelic Wikipedia

References

External links 

 wk.br stats
 Edits Reverts stats
 Statistics for Breton Wikipedia by Erik Zachte

Wikipedias by language
Breton-language mass media
Internet properties established in 2004
Wikipedias in Celtic languages